The Senate Standing Committee On Official languages (OLLO) is a standing committee of the Senate of Canada responsible for examining issues of Francophone culture in Canada, especially in regard to the Official Languages Act. It is mandated to study, as the Senate may decide, bills, messages, petitions, inquiries, papers and other matters relating to Canada's official languages generally.

Members 

The Representative of the Government in the Senate and Leader of the Opposition in the Senate are both ex-officio members of the committee.

External links
 

Committees of the Senate of Canada
Bilingualism in Canada